Michael Charles Walters (born October 18, 1957) is a former Major League Baseball pitcher. He bats and throws right-handed.

Walters was drafted by the California Angels in the 1st round of the 1977 amateur draft.

External links

1957 births
Living people
Major League Baseball pitchers
Baseball players from St. Louis
Chaffey Panthers baseball players
Minnesota Twins players
Salt Lake City Gulls players
Redwood Pioneers players
El Paso Diablos players
Salinas Angels players
Quad Cities Angels players
Idaho Falls Angels players
Toledo Mud Hens players
Orlando Twins players